Sweden Super League is a rugby league competition of Sweden. It was founded in 2010 and they played their first season in 2011. The current premiership winner is the Spartacus Reds winning in 2012.

History
After the Scandinavian Nines Tournament Tournament in April 2010, a domestic league was formed named the Sweden National Rugby League Competition (or SNRLC) comprising three teams in 2011 with Borås Ravens coming up with their first premiership. Their second season introduced the West Coast Masters, now making it four teams in the league, where Spartacus Reds won their first premiership in 2012.

Teams

See also

List of rugby league competitions

References

External links

Sports leagues in Sweden
2010 establishments in Sweden
Sports leagues established in 2010
Rugby league in Sweden
European rugby league competitions
Professional sports leagues in Sweden